Darkman is a 1990 American superhero film directed and co-written by Sam Raimi. Based on a short story Raimi wrote that paid homage to Universal's horror films of the 1930s, the film stars Liam Neeson as scientist Peyton Westlake, who is brutally attacked, disfigured, and left for dead by ruthless mobster Robert Durant (Larry Drake), after his girlfriend, attorney Julie Hastings (Frances McDormand), runs afoul of corrupt developer Louis Strack Jr. (Colin Friels). After a treatment to cure him of his burn injuries fails, Westlake develops super-human abilities, which also have the unintended side-effect of rendering him mentally unstable and borderline psychotic. Consumed with vengeance, he decides to hunt down those who disfigured him.

Unable to secure the rights to The Shadow, Raimi decided to create his own superhero and struck a deal with Universal Studios to make his first Hollywood studio film. It was produced by Robert Tapert, and was written by Raimi, his brother Ivan, Chuck Pfarrer, and brothers Daniel and Joshua Goldin. Makeup effects artist Tony Gardner, who also cameos in the film as the Lizard Man in the carnival Freak Show sequence, designed and created the makeup effects required to turn Neeson into Darkman.

Neeson's first action film in the main role, Darkman received generally positive reviews by critics and was commercially successful, grossing $48 million, above its $14 million budget. This financial success spawned two direct-to-video sequels, Darkman II: The Return of Durant (1995) and Darkman III: Die Darkman Die (1996), as well as comic books, video games, and action figures. Neeson did not reprise his role for the direct-to-video sequels.

Plot
Dr. Peyton Westlake is developing a new type of synthetic skin to help burn victims but cannot get past a flaw that causes the skin to rapidly disintegrate after 99 minutes. His girlfriend, attorney Julie Hastings, discovers the Belisarius Memorandum, an incriminating document that proves developer Louis Strack Jr. has been bribing members of the zoning commission. When she confronts Strack, he confesses, showing Julie that he plans to design a brand-new city, creating a substantial number of new jobs. He warns Julie that the city's reigning crime boss, Robert G. Durant, also wants the document.

At Westlake's lab, Westlake and his assistant Yakitito are testing the skin when the lights go out. The synthetic skin remains stable after 100 minutes, so Westlake deduces that the skin is photosensitive. Their joy is short lived as Durant and his mobsters show up and demand the Memorandum, which Westlake knows nothing about. They search for the document, and Durant has his men kill Yakitito and beat Westlake, burning his hands and dipping his face in acid. After finding the document, they rig the lab to explode. Julie witnesses the blast as a hideously burned Westlake is thrown through the roof and into the river. As a John Doe, he is brought to a hospital and subjected to a radical treatment which cuts the nerves of the spinothalamic tract; physical pain is no longer felt at the cost of tactile sensation. This loss of sensory input gives him enhanced strength due to adrenal overload and keeps his injuries from incapacitating him, but also mentally destabilizes him. After waking up from a coma, Westlake escapes from the hospital.

Believed dead by Julie, Westlake re-establishes his lab in a condemned building and begins a long process of digitization to create a mask of his original face, using the time to plot revenge against Durant and his men. He kills Durant's henchman Rick by putting his head in front of an incoming car after forcing him to reveal the identities of the other men. He then studies them to subdue and impersonate them (having a talent for impressionism). When his face mask is complete, Westlake manages to convince Julie that he was in a coma rather than dead. He mentions that he is aware of Julie seeing Strack after his supposed death; she responds that Strack only comforted her. Keeping his disfigurement from her, Westlake instead probes whether she would accept him despite his appearance.

Westlake sows dissension and confusion among Durant's henchmen by assuming their identities. On a date at a carnival with Julie, Westlake loses his temper after an altercation over a stuffed elephant and assaults a worker, revealing to Julie that something is wrong with him. He flees as his face begins to melt, and she follows him, discovering the discarded mask; she calls to Peyton that she still loves him regardless. Julie tells Strack she can no longer see him before discovering the stolen Memorandum on his desk, confirming that he was collaborating with Durant the entire time. She reveals Westlake is still alive, but Strack tells her as long as he has the Memorandum, no charges can be filed. When Julie leaves, Durant enters and is told to capture Julie and kill Westlake.

Durant intercepts Julie, kidnapping her before attacking Westlake's lair. Two of his men enter the lab to locate and kill Westlake but are outmaneuvered and eliminated. Durant flees in a helicopter with Westlake dangling from an attached cable, which he uses to crash the helicopter. Impersonating Durant, Westlake meets up with Strack and a captive Julie at the top of an unfinished building. Strack breaks Westlake's ruse, and they fight; Westlake eventually gains the upper hand and dangles Strack by his ankle in the air. Strack says that killing him would not be something he could live with. Westlake drops Strack, remarking: "I'm learning to live with a lot of things". Julie tries to convince Westlake that he can still return to his old life, but he tells her he has changed internally as well, and cannot subject anyone to his new, vicious nature. He rushes from Julie as they exit an elevator, pulling on a mask and running into a crowd of pedestrians. As Julie unsuccessfully searches for him, a disguised Westlake watches her for a few moments before turning and walking away, narrating, "I am everyone and no one. Everywhere. Nowhere. Call me... Darkman".

Cast
 Liam Neeson as Dr. Peyton Westlake / Darkman, a brilliant scientist who was left for dead and burned alive as he returns to seek revenge on those who disfigured him. Initially, Raimi's longtime friend and collaborator Bruce Campbell was set to play Darkman, but the studio rejected the idea because they did not think Campbell could carry the role. Campbell cameos in the film as Peyton's last seen disguise (credited as "Final Shemp"). Gary Oldman and Bill Paxton were also considered before Liam Neeson was cast. For the role, Raimi was looking for someone who could suggest "a monster with the soul of a man, and I needed an actor who could do that beneath a lot of makeup" and liked Neeson's "old Gary Cooper charisma". The actor was drawn to the operatic nature of the story and the inner turmoil of his character. To research for the role, Neeson contacted the Phoenix Society for Burn Survivors, an organization that supports the emotional and social healing of burn survivors.
 Frances McDormand as Julie Hastings, an attorney and Peyton's love interest. Raimi had wanted to work with Frances McDormand but the studio resisted this notion and almost cast Julia Roberts before Pretty Woman made her a star. At one point, they wanted Demi Moore for the role. The director even tested Bridget Fonda but felt that she was too young for Neeson. McDormand described the character saying "this is the first bimbo I've played".
 Colin Friels as Louis Strack Jr., a corrupt and haughty billionaire developer who runs Strack Industries. He bribes members of the city zoning commission to further his ambitious construction project (which he dubs the "City of the Future"), and employs Durant and his mobsters to eliminate anyone who interferes, even his own wife. He and Darkman have their final battle atop one of Strack's half-finished skyscrapers at the film's climax.
 Larry Drake as Robert G. Durant, a ruthless and sadistic mob boss who works under the payroll of Strack. He auditioned for the film and Raimi liked the way he underplayed the character, "quiet and careful, yet intense", the actor remembers. Raimi had never seen L.A. Law but found that Drake's face reminded him of "a modern day Edward G. Robinson. He looked so mean, so domineering, yet he had this urban wit about him. I thought, 'My God, this guy is not only threatening-looking, he has a good physical presence – what a perfect adversary for the Darkman!'"
 Nelson Mashita as Yakitito "Yakky" Yanagito, lab assistant to Peyton Westlake. He is killed by Anderson.
 Ted Raimi as Rick Anderson, Robert G. Durant's henchman: an unassuming-looking man, he is treated more like a very close friend or confidant/protege by Durant. He is the first henchman killed by Darkman, getting his head run over.
 Nicholas Worth as Pauly Mazzuchelli, Robert G. Durant's henchman: a stocky, physically imposing man, he has a shaved head and a small tattoo of a dagger (and a single drop of blood) on the right side. He is the first person impersonated by Darkman, stealing a money drop. He is the second henchman killed; Durant believed Pauly stole the drop money and found tickets to Rio for Pauly and the still missing Rick, and threw Pauly out the window.
 Dan Hicks as Skip Altwater, his left leg is false (making it ideal for concealing weapons). He's last seen during the attack on Darkman's lair - while abducting Julie - and doesn't appear for the rest of the film. A cut/deleted scene shows Darkman killing Skip with his own prosthetic leg.
 Jessie Lawrence Ferguson as Eddie Black, a rival crime boss, dispatched by Durant.
 Rafael H. Robledo as Rudy Guzman, a collaborator of Durant's, who seems to despise Durant, calling Durant a "son of a [bitch]". He is killed by Smiley when a shackled and gagged Guzman runs into him wearing a Westlake mask underneath a Smiley mask, tricking Smiley into shooting Guzman.
 Dan Bell as Sam "Smiley" Rogers, a henchman of Durant's who laughs like a hyena, he is the most ruthless of Durant's collaborators. He is killed after Darkman recreated the same drinking bird triggered gas explosion that mutilated Peyton.
 Arsenio "Sonny" Trinidad as Hung Fat, a Chinese Triad boss who owes Durant money.
 Bridget Hoffman as Computer Voice

Additionally, Raimi's brother Ivan and director John Landis have cameos as hospital staff, while Jenny Agutter plays the doctor treating Westlake's burns. Neal McDonough, William Lustig, Scott Spiegel and Stuart Cornfeld portray dockworkers. Other appearances include Joel and Ethan Coen as the driver and passenger in an Oldsmobile, Professor Toru Tanaka and Nathan Jung as Hung Fat's Chinese Warriors, and Julius Harris as the Gravedigger. In the final scene of the film, Campbell portrays the disguised Darkman as he flees, credited as "Final Shemp".

Production

Development and origins
The idea for Darkman developed from a short story Raimi had written about a man who could change his face. The story drew elements from The Phantom of the Opera, The Elephant Man, and The Shadow (Raimi had previously sought the film rights to The Shadow; when rejected, he decided to write his own superhero). Raimi was also inspired by the Universal horror films of the 1930s and 1940s because "they made me fear the hideous nature of the hero and at the same time drew me to him. I went back to that idea of the man who is noble and turns into a monster". He originally wrote a 30-page short story, titled "The Darkman", and then developed into a 40-page treatment. At this point, according to Raimi, "it became the story of a man who had lost his face and had to take on other faces, a man who battled criminals using this power". It also became more of a tragic love story in the tradition of The Hunchback of Notre Dame. In 1987, Raimi submitted the treatment to Universal Pictures which they liked, green-lighted a budget in the range of $8–12 million, and suggested that he get a screenwriter to flesh out the story.

Writing

The more Raimi worked, the more Darkman became a crime-fighting figure like Batman, "a non-superpowered man who, here, is a hideous thing who fights crime. As he became that hideous thing, it became more like The Phantom of the Opera, the creature who wants the girl but who was too much of a beast to have her", according to Raimi. The process of developing his treatment into a screenplay was difficult with Raimi hiring ex-Navy SEAL Chuck Pfarrer based on his work on Navy SEALs. He wrote the first draft and then Raimi's brother, Ivan (a doctor), wrote drafts two through four with Sam. Ivan made sure that the medical aspects and scientific elements were authentic as possible given the nature of the story.

As Raimi and his producing partner Robert Tapert progressed through various drafts, they realized they had a potential franchise on their hands. Universal brought in screenwriting brothers Daniel and Joshua Goldin to work on the script. According to Daniel, they were presented with various drafts and "lots of little story documents. There was just material everywhere; drafts seemed to go in many directions". Goldin said that they "spent a lot of time talking and pulling together a way of making the story work. I think that mostly we talked in terms of the nuts and bolts of the story". The Goldins added new lines of dialogue, new characters and bits of action. The studio still wasn't satisfied, so the Raimi brothers wrote drafts six through twelve before they had a shooting script. Raimi wanted to emphasize Peyton/Darkman's arc over the course of the film, saying, "I decided to explore a man's soul. In the beginning, a sympathetic, sincere man. In the middle, a vengeful man committing heinous acts against his enemies. And in the end, a man full of self-hatred for what he's become, who must drift off into the night, into a world apart from everyone he knows and all the things he loves".

Pre-production
Working with Universal meant a significant budgetary increase for Raimi, allowing him to design and build a laboratory set for Darkman and afford helicopters and professional stuntmen to film the climactic helicopter chase through the city. He was eventually given $14 million to work with, including a longer schedule and much more effects work.

Visually, the filmmaker was interested in paying homage to Universal horror films of the 1930s. Production designer Randy Ser remarked, "if you look at Darkman's lab that he moves into, which is an old warehouse, what was on my mind was Dr. Frankenstein. There were a number of references visually to what we were thinking about in regards to those films". Raimi consciously wanted to tone down his style because of a desire to "get into the characters' heads and follow them as real human beings in extraordinary circumstances".

McDormand and Neeson worked closely in rehearsals, rewriting the three love scenes they had together after he becomes Darkman. They got through these scenes, according to the actress, by depending on "each other's knowledge, of theater and each other".

Filming
The film was shot on location in Los Angeles and Toronto, Ontario, beginning on April 19 and ending on August 10, 1989.

Raimi said directing McDormand was "very difficult". Raimi said, "apparently I didn't know Fran as well as I thought I did ... The reason it was difficult was that our conception of the best movie to make differed, arguing in trying to make the best picture possible. We did come across disagreements, but they were very healthy".

Durant's finger collection developed over the Pfarrer and Raimi brothers drafts. The director wanted a specific trademark for the character – one that hinted at a military background.

Neeson worked in ten-piece prosthetic makeup, sometimes for 18 hours. He saw the lengthy time spent in extensive makeup as a challenge and liked "the idea of working behind a mask on camera, and just exploring the possibilities of what that entailed". He and makeup effects designer Tony Gardner did tests using specific glues, foams, and bandage coverings. They also timed how fast they could apply the prosthetic makeup and put the costume on. Neeson worked with the costume designer on his outfit, including aspects like the cloak. The hardest part for the actor was speaking with false teeth and he ended up doing "a lot of work on my voice – I didn't want the [false teeth] to move at all".

Post-production
Raimi and Tapert ran into conflicts with the studio during post-production. The director had a problem with the editor that the studio assigned him and eight weeks into assembling the rough cut, he was not following Raimi's storyboards. The editor had a nervous breakdown and left. Early preview screenings did not go well as people laughed in the wrong places and complained about a lack of a happy ending. Universal told Raimi that some people rated Darkman the worst film they had ever seen. According to executives, the film was one of the worst-scoring pictures in Universal's history. Then, two preview screenings, one with Danny Elfman's score, went well. Tapert remembers, "the experience on Darkman was very difficult for Sam and me; it isn't the picture we thought it should be, based on the footage we shot and all that. The studio got nervous about some kind of wild things in it, and made us take them out, which was unfortunate". Raimi did like the "brilliant" marketing campaign that the studio came up with, releasing posters in advance with a silhouette of the main character and the question, "Who is Darkman?" According to the director, "the marketing made the film a money-maker".

Music

Soundtrack

Released on August 17, 1990, the soundtrack to Darkman was composed by Danny Elfman, who previously scored the music to Tim Burton's Batman in 1989. La-La Land Records has released an expanded soundtrack album in January 2020, featuring over 30 minutes of previously unreleased music. In 2017, Waxwork Records released the soundtrack on vinyl which was remastered from the original tapes.

Elfman said of his score: "Again old-fashioned and melodramatic, but in a way that I'm crazy about. Sam Raimi has a wonderful visual style that lends itself easily to music. It was an enormous relief writing long, extended musical sequences, something which is very rare in modern films. No reason to hold back on this one".

 "Main Titles" – 1:37
 "Woe, the Darkman ... Woe!" – 6:09
 "Rebuilding/Failure" – 3:16
 "Love Theme" – 0:56
 "Julie Transforms" – 1:11
 "Rage/Peppy Science" – 1:37
 "Creating Pauley" – 3:19
 "Double Durante" – 1:50
 "The Plot Unfolds (Dancing Freak)" – 7:01
 "Carnival from Hell" – 3:16
 "Julie Discovers Darkman" – 1:59
 "High Steel" – 4:19
 "Finale/End Credits" – 3:39

Release

Marketing
Ads asking "Who is Darkman?" began appearing on bus benches, public transit, and television as early as June 1990. Universal VP of Media Vic Fondrk said that the studio did not want to spend much money promoting the film in advance, "but we wanted to create some intrigue for the Darkman character".

Home media

DVD
In 1998, Darkman was released on DVD. Bonus material included production notes, cast & crew bios, and a trailer.

In 1999, The Return of Durant was released on DVD. Bonus material included production notes, cast & crew bios, a trailer, and web links.

In 2004, Die, Darkman, Die was released on DVD as part of the "Universal Studio Selections". The DVD contained no bonus material or even a main menu (although there were chapter selections).

All three Darkman films were released in a box set by Universal Studios in August 2007. Each is presented in 1.85:1 anamorphic widescreen, along with an English Dolby Digital 5.1 Surround track. No extra material was included. The high definition version of Darkman was released on HD DVD July 31 the same year.

Blu-ray
A Blu-ray Disc edition of the first film was released on June 16, 2010. Shout! Factory released a second Blu-ray edition on February 18, 2014.

Reception

Box office
On its opening weekend, Darkman grossed a total of $8 million in 1,786 theaters. To date, the film has grossed a total of $48.8 million worldwide.

Critical response
On Rotten Tomatoes the film has an approval rating of 84% based on reviews from 61 critics. The site's consensus states: "Gruesome and deliciously broad, Sam Raimi's Darkman bears the haunted soulfulness of gothic tragedy while packing the stylistic verve of onomatopoeia springing off a comic strip page". On Metacritic the film has a score of 65 based on reviews from 15 critics, indicating "generally favorable reviews". Audiences polled by CinemaScore gave the film an average grade of "C+" on an A+ to F scale.

Los Angeles Times film critic Michael Wilmington felt that Darkman was the only film at the time "that successfully captures the graphic look, rhythm and style of the superhero books". Terrence Rafferty of The New Yorker said, "Raimi works from inside the cheerfully violent adolescent-male sensibility of superhero comics, as if there were no higher style for a filmmaker to aspire to, and the absence of condescension is refreshing". Peter Travers of Rolling Stone wrote: "Raimi's live-action comic book aims to deliver scares spiked with laughs. That it does". USA Today gave the film three out of four stars, and wrote: "With good leads and a few bucks, he's come up with a high-octane revenge piece mentionable in the same breath as its predecessors". Richard Corliss in Time said "Raimi isn't effective with his actors, and the dialogue lacks smart menace, but his canny visual sense carries many a scene". Entertainment Weekly gave the film a "B" rating and Owen Gleiberman wrote: "The movie is full of jaunty, Grand Guignol touches (the main gangster enjoys snapping and collecting fingers), but Raimi's images also have a spectral, kinetic beauty". In his review for The Washington Post, Joe Brown wrote: "Though Raimi seems to be trying to restrain himself, his giddily sick sense of humor still pops out all over the place – Darkman is a frenetic funhouse ride that has you laughing and screaming at the same time". Rita Kempley also of The Washington Post called it "a fiendishly stylish journey that links the classics of transfiguration to the terrors of our times". On the TV program At the Movies, Gene Siskel and Roger Ebert gave the film "two thumbs up". Both remarked at how original and stylised Raimi's sense of direction was, with Siskel adding that Darkman as a character was "interesting".

Ian Nathan of Empire magazine said the film was "certainly not Raimi at his best, but some knowing genre nods and an array of great effects make up much of the deficit". Peoples Ralph Novak called Darkman, a "loud, sadistic, stupidly written, wretchedly acted film".

Darkman was singled out for notice by comic-book writer Peter David in the Comics Buyer's Guide as "The Perfect Super-Hero Film of All Time", although this assessment was based upon other features of the film than general quality. 

The A.V. Club called Darkman a key transitional film, bridging from Burton's Batman films, while forging its own dark path to the future.

Merchandise
Darkman has been the subject of two Marvel Comics series (one a movie adaptation, the other an original sequel), numerous novels, as well as a video game published by Ocean Software, Darkman (1991). Tony Gardner's company Alterian, Inc. produced two different Halloween masks of the Darkman character after the film was released. Merchandising for the character all but disappeared for close to a decade until SOTA Toys obtained the rights to make a Darkman action figure. SOTA president Jerry Macaluso was interviewed by Dread Central:

In 2005, SOTA produced two versions of their Darkman action figure (including interchangeable head and hands to allow the figure to be either bandaged or revealing his scarred visage), as well as a Darkman statue.

Dynamite Entertainment in 2006 reached an agreement with Universal Studios Consumer Products Group to produce original comics based on Darkman. A bimonthly limited series entitled Darkman vs. Army of Darkness was published from August 2006 to March 2007.

In November 2007, Sideshow Collectibles put up for pre-order a 1:4 scale "Premium" Format Figure version of Darkman that would be released in 3rd quarter 2008.

Comic books
With release in 1990, Marvel Comics published a 3-issue adaptation of Darkman in color along with a larger black and white magazine size adaptation consisting of all three issues. In 1993, Darkman returned in a 6 issue mini-series also published by Marvel Comics. In 2006, Dynamite Entertainment published a crossover that pitted Darkman against Sam Raimi's Ash Williams of the Evil Dead/Army of Darkness franchise.

Novels
Alongside the theatrical release in 1990, Jove Books published the novel adaptation written by Randall Boyll. In 1994, Boyll returned to expand upon the adventures of Darkman in a four-novel miniseries from Pocket Books. Over Pocket Books' four novels (The Hangman, The Price of Fear, The Gods of Hell, and In the Face of Death) Boyll further develops Darkman's character and how he deals with his new existence as an outcast individual with the ability to help others.

Future

Sequels

There were two direct-to-video sequels, Darkman II: The Return of Durant (1995) and Darkman III: Die Darkman Die (1996).

In April 2022, Neeson stated that he would be interested in reprising his role for a legacy sequel to the original film. The producer of the sequel film was attached, and the studio had started to talk about the sequel.

Television
Universal Television financed a 30-minute television pilot presentation based on Darkman, which was made in 1992 and was to be shown on Fox. The pilot, directed by Brian Grant, retold the origin of the character (with some alterations) and introduced several new characters. Christopher Bowen starred in the role of Peyton Westlake/Darkman, Larry Drake reprised his role of Robert G. Durant, and Kathleen York played the cop, Jenny.

The origin is similar to the one in the original film as Peyton discovers his synthetic skin, is attacked and left for dead by Durant and his gang. In this version, however, Peyton is already married to Julie, and she is killed in the explosion. As in the films, Westlake becomes Darkman, and seeks vengeance on Durant and his gang. Darkman's headquarters are in an abandoned observatory overlooking the city, and he is wanted by the police for his actions against Durant's gang. The pilot ends with some scenes from the first film (particularly of Darkman and Durant fighting) and Darkman stating that Justice will answer with a brand new face.

The pilot was unaired and never got picked up.

References

External links
 
 
 
 

1990 films
1990s superhero films
American science fiction action films
1990s English-language films
Films directed by Sam Raimi
Films about scientists
Burn survivors in fiction
Films shot in Los Angeles
Films shot in Toronto
Universal Pictures films
Films scored by Danny Elfman
Films adapted into comics
Films with screenplays by Ivan Raimi
Films with screenplays by Sam Raimi
1990s vigilante films
1990s American films